Ghiyath ad-Din Mas'ud ( 1108 – 13 September 1152) was the Seljuq Sultan of Iraq and western Persia in 1133–1152.

Reign
Ghiyath ad-Din Masud was the son of sultan Muhammad I Tapar, and his wife Nistandar Jahan Khatun. At the age of twelve (1120–1121), he rebelled unsuccessfully against his elder brother, Mahmud II, who however forgave him. At Mahmud's death in 1131, the power was contended between Mahmud's son, Dawud, Masud, whose powerbase was in Iraq , Seljuq-Shah (in Fars and Khuzistan) and Toghrul II. In 1133 Masud was able to obtain recognition as sultan from the emirs of Baghdad, and to receive the investiture by caliph al-Mustarshid. Toghrul, who controlling the eastern provinces of the western Seljuq, launched a military campaign but was defeated by Masud in May 1133. Toghrul died in 1134. Also in 1133 Mas'ud supported Zengi, besieged by al-Mustarshid's troops in Mosul.

In 1135 caliph al-Mustarshid contested his authority but, on 14 June of that year, he was defeated and made prisoner at Daimarg, between Hamadan and Baghdad, and killed two months later by the Hashshashins. As al-Mustarshid's successor, al-Rashid, also rebelled with the support of Zengi, Mas'ud besieged him in Baghdad, forcing him to flee to Mosul, where he was also killed by the Hashshashins. Although able to ensure control over Iraq, Mas'ud's power over the rest of the Suljuq empire was uncertain: apart from Khorasan and Transoxiana, which had been long time under the control of his uncle Ahmed Sanjar, Dawud kept control over Azerbaijan for several years, while weastern Persia was effectively ruled by emir Bozaba until Mas'ud defeated him, together with other emirs, in 1147. In 1148 Mas'ud faced another coalition against him, this time aiming to place Malik Shah on the throne in his place.

During his troublesome reign, Masud was forced to accept to delegate his authority to numerous emirs with the iqta', a tax institution which reduced the imperial incomes. Other became effectively independent sultans, such as Zengi. This caused, according to historian ibn al-Athir, the beginning of the steep decline of the Seljuq Empire.

Death
Mas'ud died at Hamadan in 1152. He was briefly succeeded by Malik-Shah III, who had been forgiven by Masud, and also given one the sultan's daughters as spouse.

Family
One of his wives was Gawhar Khatun, the daughter of Sultan Ahmad Sanjar. They married in 1134, after his accession to the throne. Gawhar Khatun, the daughter of this union was married by Masud to his nephew Sultan Dawud, son of Sultan Mahmud II. They failed to get on together, and Masud gave her to Dawuds brother, Sultan Muhammad II. Another wife was Zubaida Khatun, the daughter of Sultan Berkyaruq. She dominated Mas'ud. She died in 1138. In 1136–7, he gave one of his daughters in marriage to Dubais, son of Sadaq, and in 1138, he himself married Dubaiss daughter Sufra Khatun, 
whose mother Sharaf Khatun, was the daughter of Amid al-daula and his wife, Zubaida Khatun, the daughter of Nizam al-Mulk. Around the same time, he also married Mustazhiriyya Khatun, the daughter of his uncle Qavurt. With her, he had a son, born in 1139. Another wife was Arab Khatun. She was the mother of Masuds son, Malik-Shah. Another wife was the daughter of Abbasid Caliph Al-Muqtafi. They married in 1140. Her dowry was one hundred thousand dinars. The wedding procession was delayed for five years because of her young age. However, the marriage was never consummated because of Masuds ultimate death. Another wife was Abkhaziya Khatun. She was the daughter of one of the Georgian kings.

References

Sources

External links
The Encyclopaedia of Islam: Fascicules 111–112 

1100s births
1152 deaths
Seljuk rulers
People of the Nizari–Seljuk wars